Nick Leijten (born 20 September 1991) is a Dutch former footballer who played as a goalkeeper.

Club career
In 2016, Leijten moved from DESO from Oss to second-tier Eerste Divisie club FC Den Bosch, where he signed a contract until 30 June 2017, with an option to extend until 2019. He made his professional debut in the Den Bosch on 23 September 2016 in a game against FC Emmen. In this match he replaced Kees Heemskerk after 8 minutes with a head injury. Den Bosch triggered the option in Leijten's contract on 31 March 2017 and secured his services until mid-2019.

In mid-2020 he moved to TEC in the Tweede Divisie. Leijten retired from football in January 2021 to focus on his family and his work as a plasterer.

References

External links
 

1991 births
Living people
Sportspeople from Oss
Dutch footballers
FC Den Bosch players
SV TEC players
Eerste Divisie players
Tweede Divisie players
Association football goalkeepers
Footballers from North Brabant
21st-century Dutch people